The Glasair GlaStar (sometimes Glastar) is an American amateur-built aircraft that was designed by Tom Hamilton and produced by Stoddard-Hamilton Aircraft and later Glasair Aviation. It was first flown in 1994 and was superseded in production by the Glasair Sportsman 2+2 c. 2005. When it was available the aircraft was supplied as a kit for amateur construction.

Design and development

The GlaStar features a strut-braced high-wing, a two-seats-in-side-by-side configuration enclosed cockpit accessed via doors, fixed tricycle landing gear or conventional landing gear and a single engine in tractor configuration.

The aircraft is made with a welded steel fuselage, with a fiberglass covering and aluminum wings. Its  span wing employs a NASA GA(W)-2  airfoil at the wing root, with a NASA GA(W)-2 mod at the wing tip. The aircraft proved underpowered with the Rotax, and later the   Lycoming O-320 and the  Lycoming O-360 four-stroke powerplants were used. The landing gear can be rapidly converted between tricycle and taildragger configurations.

Initial factory estimated construction time was 1200 hours.

Accidents and Incidents
In 1996, a service recall was issued for the control yoke assembly of select GlaStar kits. In 1999, one of the GlaStar kits not included in the recall crashed, killing its two occupants.

Variants

Symphony SA-160
Type certified version, produced by Ostmecklenburgische Flugzeugbau (OMF) and later Symphony Aircraft.
Glasair Sportsman 2+2
Four seat development with a gross weight of  that replaced the original GlaStar in production.
Plane Driven PD-1
Roadable version produced by Plane Driven.

Specifications (GlaStar)

References

External links

Homebuilt aircraft
GlaStar
GlaStar
Single-engined tractor aircraft
High-wing aircraft